Staf Declercq (16 September 1884 – 22 October 1942) was a Flemish nationalist collaborator, co-founder and leader of the Flemish nationalist Vlaamsch Nationaal Verbond (Flemish National League, or VNV).

Biography
He was born as Jeroom Gustaaf Declercq in Everbeek, East Flanders on 16 September 1884. He was a member of the moderate Frontpartij, became party leader in 1932, and moved them to the right, converting them into VNV the following year. In 1936 his new party gained 13.6% of the votes in Flanders, and 14.7% in 1939.

Welcoming of the Nazi German occupation, Declercq believed it to constitute a chance for the creation of a Diets state, an unprecedented (apart from the medieval Burgundian personal union) Dutch language-based community uniting Flanders, the Netherlands and even the part of northern France with Flemish dialects (corresponding to French Flanders). His organization supported the German occupiers in the identification and round-up of Jews for deportation.

He died in Ghent and was succeeded by Hendrik Elias. In 1978 the Vlaamse Militanten Orde had his body transferred to the cemetery in Asse.

References

Bibliography
 Belgian Fascism by R. H. Chertok (Washington University in St. Louis thesis, 1975)
 Biographical Dictionary of the Extreme Right Since 1890 edited by Philip Rees (1991)

Footnotes

External links
 A Short History of Flanders and the Flemish Movement from the Vlaams Blok site.
 

1884 births
1942 deaths
People from Brakel
Flemish National Union politicians
Members of the Chamber of Representatives (Belgium)
Belgian collaborators with Nazi Germany
Holocaust perpetrators in Belgium